Khardon Kalan (sometimes written as Khardoun Kalan, Khardone Kalan) is a village in Shajapur district, Madhya Pradesh, India.

Demographics
As of the 2011 Census of India, Khardon Kalan had a population of  spread over  households. Males constitute 52.1% of the population and females 47.9%. Khardon Kalan has an average literacy rate of 67.76%, while 12.8% of the population is under 6 years of age.

References

Villages in Shajapur district